Israel Shreve (December 24, 1739 – December 14, 1799) was a colonel in the 2nd New Jersey Regiment during the American Revolution. He fought at the Battle of Brandywine and at the Battle of Germantown and wintered at Valley Forge.

Early life
Israel Shreve was born December 24, 1739, in the Shreve family homestead at Mount Pleasant, in Mansfield Township, Burlington County, New Jersey, an old community founded by Quakers. His father was Benjamin Shreve and his mother was Rebecca French; they were married at Springfield Township Friends Meeting House February 23, 1729, and raised eight children, of whom Israel was fifth. Israel married Grace Curtis February 27, 1760, at a Quaker meeting somewhere in Burlington County, New Jersey, and after she died in 1771 Israel married Mary Cokely on May 10, 1773, in Philadelphia. Grace gave birth to four children, while Mary gave birth to seven more. One of these was Henry Miller Shreve. Israel worked and owned farm land and was appointed justice of the peace for Gloucester County, New Jersey, in February, 1775.

Revolutionary War
After news came of the Battles of Lexington and Concord, Israel and his brothers William and Samuel enlisted as officers in the New Jersey State militia. In October 1775, the Continental Congress recommended to the Provincial Congress of New Jersey that two battalions of soldiers be raised for service in the Continental Army. Israel was appointed lieutenant colonel in the second battalion, under command of Colonel William Maxwell. Also serving in this battalion was Israel's thirteen-year-old son, John.

The 2nd New Jersey Regiment was sent north to relieve Benedict Arnold's attack on Quebec. The regiment arrived in Albany, New York by March 27, 1776, then reached Fort Ticonderoga by April 18. Shreve arrived in Quebec City May 3 under cannon fire from the British. When a British fleet appeared in the Saint Lawrence River, Shreve retreated west with 1,900 Americans. General John Thomas ordered Shreve to take some of the wounded to Sorel, at the juncture of the Richelieu and Saint Lawrence River. By June 11, American forces had been defeated by British troops near Trois-Rivières, Quebec, and they abandoned Sorel on June 14, just three hours before the British arrived. Shreve was back at Fort Ticonderoga June 16, 1776, and remained there until November, when the enlistments for the 2nd New Jersey expired.

By April 1777, Shreve and his regiment were in Princeton, New Jersey. He spent the summer in Reading, Pennsylvania, and returned to service in November 1777. From March to May 1778, Shreve and the 2nd New Jersey were stationed at Haddonfield, New Jersey. When General Charles Cornwallis led British troops out of Philadelphia, some of his men burned Shreve's house near Mount Holly, and Sir Henry Clinton offered a reward of 25 guineas for information on the soldiers' identities. Shreve's 2nd New Jersey followed the British to Monmouth Courthouse, site of the Battle of Monmouth on June 28, 1778. Shreve walked over the battlefield after the British had retreated farther north to New York.

The following year Shreve took the 2nd New Jersey on the Sullivan Expedition. They left Easton, Pennsylvania, on June 18, 1779, arriving in Wyoming, Pennsylvania, five days later. They remained in Wyoming more than a month before loading 117 rowboats with 1,200 pack horses and 900 cattle. The regiment reached Wyalusing, Pennsylvania, on August 5 and Tioga Point on August 11. Both Israel and John Shreve returned to an army fort at Tioga while Sullivan led his command farther west.

In November 1779, Shreve led the 2nd New Jersey Regiment to the Continental Army's winter encampment at Morristown, New Jersey. On June 7, 1780, the British Army under Henry Clinton crossed from Staten Island to New Jersey. On June 23, they came west from Elizabeth, New Jersey, toward Chatham and Morristown, and met Americans at Springfield Township. The ensuing fight became known as the Battle of Springfield. Shreve's men waited at a bridge just west of the village of Springfield as Hessians under Lieutenant General Wilhelm, Baron von Knyphausen came from the east. As Shreve's men fired cannons, a musket ball crashed into a soldier standing next to John Shreve, and as he turned his companion over another musket ball hit John's calf. Israel Shreve's regiment was in danger of being surrounded, so General Nathanael Greene ordered him to retreat.

On January 20, 1781, Shreve alerted Washington about revolt in the New Jersey Line of the Continental Army at Pompton, New Jersey, "It is with pain I inform your Excellency, that the troops at this place revolted this evening and marched towards Trenton. Their behaviour and demands are similar to those of the Pennsylvania line." Washington answered the same day requesting to suppress the Pompton Mutiny, which was accomplished by General Robert Howe.

Shreve resigned his commission in the Continental Army in January 1781. Two years later, he joined other New Jersey officers in becoming a founding member of the Society of the Cincinnati in the State of New Jersey.

Later life
In 1788 he led his wife and six of his children, along with twenty one other settlers to south-western Pennsylvania, and settled in Rostraver Township, Westmoreland County, Pennsylvania. In January 1789 - June 1789, Shreve accompanied retired Continental Army colonel George Morgan to Spanish Louisiana Territory to survey the western bank of the Mississippi River. Morgan, who was a land developer, received permission from the Spanish Ambassador to the United States, Don Diego de Gardoqui to establish a colony on the Mississippi River at Anse a la Graisse, located in present-day Missouri. On January 3, 1789, the expedition departed from Pittsburgh and traveled along the Ohio and Mississippi River until they reached Anse a la Graisse; a new town was demarcated and named New Madrid by Morgan. On June 19, 1789, members of the expedition including Shreve safely returned to Pittsburgh. During the journey, Shreve kept a journal, in which he described geography, environment, and encounters with the Native Americans.

Instead of moving to New Madrid, Shreve decided to lease land in Fayette County, Pennsylvania, from General George Washington. Shreve contracted to buy  of land from Washington, but spent several years haggling over payments and prices despite settling on the land. Washington threatened to bring a lawsuit for payment, but no suit was recorded. Washington wrote Shreve in 1798 and 1799 asking for payments due, but could not bring himself to sue a fellow army officer. In his turn, on 21 December 1798, Shreve wrote to Washington asking for delay in payments. Shreve and Washington both died on the same day - December 14, 1799 - although hundreds of miles apart.

Gallery

References

Sources
 Allen, L. P. (1901). The genealogy and history of the Shreve family from 1641. Greenfield, Ill: Privately Printed, 1901.
 Fleming, Thomas (1973). The forgotten victory: The battle for New Jersey, 1780. New York: Reader's Digest Press.
 Mackey, Harry D (1973). The gallant men of the Delaware forts, 1777. Philadelphia: Dorrance and Company.
 Nelson, William, and Berthold Fernow (1899). Calendar of records in the office of the Secretary of State. 1614-1703. The Press Printing and Publishing Co.
 Stryker, William S. (1927). The Battle of Monmouth. Port Washington, New York: Kennikat Press.
 Thompson, William Y. (1979). Israel Shreve: Revolutionary War officer. Ruston, Louisiana: McGinty Trust Fund Publications.

Further reading
 Allen, L P. The Genealogy and History of the Shreve Family from 1641. Greenfield, Ill: Privately Printed, 1901.
 Israel Shreve Records. The American Revolution: Manuscript sources Special Collections and University Archives, Rutgers University Libraries. 
 Anderson, Bethany. Finding aid for Israel Shreve Journals, 1788-1797, William L. Clements Library, University of Michigan, n.d.

External links

 
 Biographical and Historical Notes on Colonel Israel Shreve
 University of Houston Digital Library, Israel Shreve Revolutionary War Letters, 1768-1894.
 Israel Shreve's Distillery in Perryopolis, Pennsylvania
 http://www.latech.edu/library/scma/ The Israel Shreve Letters, 1771–1804, are housed at Louisiana Tech University, Prescott Memorial Library, Department of Special Collections, Manuscripts, and Archives.

Continental Army officers from New Jersey
1799 deaths
1739 births
People from Fayette County, Pennsylvania
People from Mansfield Township, Burlington County, New Jersey
People of New Jersey in the American Revolution
People of colonial New Jersey
Military personnel from Pennsylvania